Fifty-seventh Army may refer to:
Fifty-Seventh Army (Japan)
57th Army (Soviet Union)